Mary Rice is a paralympic athlete from Ireland competing mainly in category T34 sprint events.

Career
Rice has competed in the Paralympics on two occasions, firstly in 1996 and then again in 2000.

In the 1996 games, she competed in the 100m and 200m winning a bronze in the 200m. In her second games she won a silver in the 400m as well as competing in the 200m and discus throw. Rice originally won a bronze medal in the 400m race but was upgraded to silver after Deborah Brennan was disqualified.

Personal life
Rice's son Nathan competes in disabled tennis. Her sister Sharon Rice is also a Paralympic athlete.

References

External links
Paralympic profile

Athletes (track and field) at the 1996 Summer Paralympics
Athletes (track and field) at the 2000 Summer Paralympics
Irish wheelchair racers
Living people
Medalists at the 1996 Summer Paralympics
Medalists at the 2000 Summer Paralympics
Paralympic athletes of Ireland
Paralympic bronze medalists for Ireland
Paralympic medalists in athletics (track and field)
Paralympic silver medalists for Ireland
World record holders in Paralympic athletics
Year of birth missing (living people)